Katamdevara Kote is a small village in Challakere Taluk, Chitradurga District of India. It is 33 kilometers away from Challakere town towards Kalyanadurga town.
Its population is around 2000. The village contains a Government Higher Primary School, a Primary Health CenterAnganawadi Center and a private convent. The main crops are jowar, onion, banana and groundnut. Here anjineya temple is famous 
Famous hotels and shops = jagappa daba,thathppa shop,

Villages in Chitradurga district